Scopula suda is a moth of the  family Geometridae. It is found in the Democratic Republic of Congo, Equatorial Guinea (Bioko), Rwanda and Uganda.

References

Moths described in 1932
Taxa named by Louis Beethoven Prout
suda
Moths of Africa
Fauna of Bioko